Mátyás Rákosi (born Mátyás Rosenfeld; 9 March 1892 – 5 February 1971) was a Hungarian communist politician who was the de facto leader of Hungary from 1947 to 1956. He served first as General Secretary of the Hungarian Communist Party from 1945 to 1948 and then as General Secretary (later renamed First Secretary) of the Hungarian Working People's Party from 1948 to 1956.

Rákosi had been involved in left-wing politics since his youth, and in 1919 was a leading commissar in the short-lived Hungarian Soviet Republic. After the fall of the Communist government, he escaped the country and worked abroad as an agent of the Comintern. He was arrested in 1924 after attempting to return to Hungary and organize the Communist Party underground, and ultimately spent over fifteen years in prison. He became a cause célébre in the international Communist movement, and the predominantly Hungarian Rakosi Battalion of the International Brigades in the Spanish Civil War bore his name. Rákosi was finally allowed to leave for the Soviet Union in 1940 in exchange for prized battle flags captured by Tsarist Russian forces after the Hungarian Revolution of 1848. 

As the Red Army drove the German Wehrmacht out of Hungary at the end of World War II, Rákosi returned to his home country in early 1945 and became the leader of the re-founded Hungarian Communist Party. The Party suffered a crushing defeat in Hungary's postwar free election, at the hands of the agrarian Independent Smallholders' Party. However, at Moscow's insistence the Communists received key positions in the government including the Interior Ministry, while Rákosi himself became a heavily influential deputy prime minister. From this position the Communists were able to use political intrigue, subterfuge, and conspiracy to destroy their opponents piece by piece, in what Rákosi would later term "salami tactics". By 1948 they had gained total power over the country, and in 1949 the country was proclaimed a people's republic with Rákosi as its absolute ruler.

Rákosi was an ardent Stalinist, and his government was very loyal to the Soviet Union; he even set up a personality cult of his own, modeled on that of Stalin. He presided over the mass imprisonment of hundreds of thousands of Hungarian people, and the deaths of thousands. He orchestrated show trials modeled on those of the USSR, among the most prominent victims of which was his former lieutenant László Rajk. His policies of collectivization and mass repression devastated the country's economy and political life, causing massive discontent. After the death of Stalin in 1953, Rákosi was partially demoted at Moscow's behest and the reformist Communist Imre Nagy became the new Prime Minister. However, Rákosi was able to use his continuing influence as First Secretary to thwart all of Nagy's attempts at reform and ultimately force the latter out of office in 1955.

However, after Soviet leader Nikita Khrushchev's famous "Secret Speech" in early 1956 denouncing the crimes of Stalin, Rákosi found his position fatally compromised. Large numbers of people within the Party and society at large began to speak out against him and call for his resignation, as information about the Party's past abuses came to light. Rákosi was finally forced to resign in July 1956 and leave for the Soviet Union, replaced by his second-in-command Ernő Gerő. The Hungarian Revolution of 1956 occurred barely three months later as a result of the abuses of Rákosi's system, and his former rival Imre Nagy became a dominant figure in the Revolution. Soviet troops ultimately crushed the uprising and installed a new Communist government under János Kádár. 

Rákosi lived out the rest of his life in exile in the Soviet Union, denied permission to return home by the Hungarian government, out of fear of mass unrest. He died in Gorky in 1971, and his ashes were returned to Hungary in secret. Rákosi is generally seen as a symbol of tyranny and oppression in Hungary.

Early years

Rákosi was born in Ada, a village in Bács-Bodrog County in the Kingdom of Hungary (now a town in Vojvodina, Serbia). Born to Jewish parents, the fourth son of József Rosenfeld, a grocer, his mother Cecília Léderer would give birth to seven more children. Of his younger siblings the most notable was Ferenc Rákosi (later Biró, 1904–2006), an administrator, who also became active in Communist politics and was, for a time, General Manager of the Mátyás Rákosi Steel and Metal Works during his brother's rule. His other siblings were Béla (1886–1944), Jolán (1888–?), Matild Gizella (1890–?), Izabella (1895–?), Margit (1896–1932), Zoltán (1898–?), Mária (1902–1938), Dezső (1906–?) and Hajnal (1908–1944). 

Rákosi's paternal grandfather participated in the Hungarian Revolution of 1848; as a result, he had to flee the village following the defeat. Rákosi's father, József Rosenfeld, was called "Kossuth's Jew" by the villagers, because he had been a member and avid supporter of the oppositionist Party of Independence and '48. He changed his surname Rosenfeld to Rákosi in 1903. He later repudiated religion and in common with most other Marxists described himself as an atheist and opponent of organised religion.

Rákosi was a diligent and good student during his childhood. He finished his elementary studies in Sopron, then took his final exam at the High Technical Gymnasium of Szeged in 1910. He then studied external trade at the Eastern Commerce Academy. He won scholarships for a year each in Hamburg (1912) and London (1913).

While still a student in Hungary, he joined the Hungarian Social Democratic Party (MSZDP) in 1910 and was also a secretary and active member of the anarcho-syndicalist student movement, the Galilei Circle. 

He served in the Austro-Hungarian Army during the First World War and was captured on the Eastern Front in 1915 and held as a prisoner-of-war in Far Eastern POW camps by the Russians until the end of the war. Taking advantage of the chaotic situation in Russia, he successfully escaped from his detention and moved to Petrograd, centre of the Bolshevik Revolution.

Early career

After returning to Hungary, he participated in the communist movement of Béla Kun and also joined the Party of Communists in Hungary. During the short-lived 133-day Communist rule after the resignation of President Mihály Károlyi, when the Hungarian Soviet Republic was established, Rákosi served as Deputy People's Commissar for Trade from 21 March to 3 April in the Revolutionary Governing Council led by Sándor Garbai. Between 3 April and 24 June 1919, Rákosi was one of the six people's commissars for social production, alongside Jenő Varga, Antal Dovcsák, Gyula Hevesi, József Kelen and Ferenc Bajáki. He was also involved in the Hungarian Red Army's Northern and Eastern military campaigns against the newly formed Czechoslovakia and Romania. At the end of July 1919, he was promoted to Commander of the internal law-enforcement Red Guard for a short time.

Following the Soviet Republic's fall, Rákosi fled Hungary on 2 August 1919 via the Austrian border, eventually to the Soviet Union where he worked as part of the Communist International, including representing it at the Livorno congress of the Italian Socialist Party in 1921. After returning to Hungary in 1924, he was imprisoned, but he was released to the Soviet Union in 1940, in exchange for the Hungarian revolutionary banners captured by Russian troops at Világos in 1849. In the Soviet Union, he became leader of the Comintern. In 1942, he married divorced lawyer Feodora (Fenia) Kornilova, a woman of Yakut origin. He returned to Debrecen, Hungary, on 30 January 1945, having been selected by the Soviet authorities to organise the Hungarian Communist Party.

Leader of Hungary

When the Red Army set up a Soviet-approved government in Hungary (1944–1945), Rákosi was appointed General Secretary of the Hungarian Communist Party (MKP) (1945). He was a member of the High National Council from 27 September to 7 December 1945. Rákosi was deputy prime minister from 1945 to 1949, and was acting Prime Minister from 1 to 4 February 1946 and on 31 May 1947.

Initially, Rákosi and the Communists appeared willing to work within the system. From 1947 onwards, however, he and the Communists began pressuring the other parties to exclude those not willing to work with the Communists on the grounds that they were "fascists" or fascist sympathisers. Later on, after the Communists won complete control, it was commonly believed that Rákosi referred to this practice as "salami tactics," saying he had destroyed the non-Communist forces in the country by "cutting them off like slices of salami." However, no verified source for the "salami" quote has ever been discovered. According to historian Norman Stone, the term might have been invented by the leader of the Hungarian Independence Party, Zoltán Pfeiffer.

The process began when Smallholder Prime Minister Ferenc Nagy was forced to resign in favour of a more pliant Smallholder, Lajos Dinnyés. By the 1947 elections, the Communists had won a majority, and had largely emasculated the next-largest non-Communist Party, the Social Democrats.

By October 1947, Rákosi had dropped all pretense of liberal democracy. He gave the non-Communist parties an ultimatum: cooperate with a new, Communist-dominated coalition government or go into exile. By the end of 1947, the opposition parties had largely shunted aside their more courageous members, leaving them in the hands of fellow travellers willing to do the Communists' bidding. In the summer of 1948, the Communists forced the Social Democrats to merge with them to form the Hungarian Working People's Party (MDP). However, the few remaining independent-minded Social Democrats were quickly pushed out in short order, leaving the MDP as an enlarged and renamed MKP. 

He also pushed out the Smallholder president, Zoltán Tildy, in favour of Social Democrat-turned-Communist Árpád Szakasits, and forced Dinnyés to resign in favour of the openly pro-Communist István Dobi. A year later, elections took place with a single list of candidates. Although non-Communists nominally still figured, in reality they were fellow travellers.

Rákosi described himself as "Stalin's best Hungarian disciple" and "Stalin's best pupil". At the height of his rule, he developed a strong cult of personality around himself.

Approximately 350,000 officials and intellectuals were purged under his rule, from 1948 to 1956. Rákosi imposed totalitarian rule on Hungary — arresting, jailing and killing both real and imagined foes in various waves of Stalin-inspired political purges. In August 1952, he also became Prime Minister (Chairman of the Council of Ministers).

However, in June 1953, Rákosi and other party leaders were summoned to Moscow, where the Soviet leadership dressed down their Hungarian counterparts for Hungary's lackluster economic performance. On 13 June 1953, to appease the Soviet Politburo, Rákosi accepted the Soviet model of collective leadership. While he gave up the premiership to Imre Nagy, he retained the office of General Secretary. Nagy favoured a more humane way of governing, which Rákosi vigorously opposed. On 9 March 1955, the Central Committee of the MDP condemned Nagy for "rightist deviation." Hungarian newspapers joined the attacks and Nagy was blamed for the country's economic problems. On 18 April, the National Assembly unanimously sacked Nagy from his post. Although the Kremlin frowned on a return of Rákosi to the premiership, he and Nagy's successor, András Hegedüs, quickly put the country back on its previous Stalinist course.

Economic policy

The post-war Hungarian economy suffered from multiple challenges. The most important was the destruction of infrastructure in the war (40% of national wealth, including all bridges, railways, raw materials, machinery, etc.). Hungary agreed to pay war reparations totalling approximately US$300 million, to the Soviet Union, Czechoslovakia and Yugoslavia, and to support Soviet garrisons. 

The Hungarian National Bank in 1946 estimated the cost of reparations as "between 19 and 22 percent of the annual national income." In spite of this, after the highest historical rate of inflation in world history, a new, stable currency was successfully introduced in August 1946 on the basis of the plans of the Communist Party and the Social Democratic Party. The low production of consumer goods and the backwardness of light industry resulted in frequent shortages, especially in the countryside, leading to discontent. In addition, the huge investments in military sectors after the outbreak of the Korean War further reduced the supply of consumer goods. Due to shortages, forced savings (state bond sales to the population) and below-inflation wage increases were introduced.

Forced retirement

 
Rákosi was then removed as General Secretary of the Party under pressure from the Soviet Politburo in June 1956 (shortly after Nikita Khrushchev's Secret Speech), and was replaced by his former second-in-command, Ernő Gerő.
To remove him from the Hungarian political scene, the Soviet Politburo exiled Rákosi to the Soviet Union later in 1956, with the official story being that he was "seeking medical attention". From 1964 to 1968 he lived in the town of Tokmok in Soviet Kirghizia and later he was sent to Arzamas and further to Gorky.

In 1970, Rákosi was finally granted permission to return to Hungary if he promised not to engage in political activities. He refused the deal and remained in the USSR where he died in Gorky in 1971. After his death, his ashes were privately returned to Hungary for burial in the Farkasréti Cemetery in Budapest. Only his initials are visible on his gravestone to avoid vandalism.

Footnotes

External links
 

1892 births
1971 deaths
People from Ada, Serbia
People from the Kingdom of Hungary
Jewish Hungarian politicians
Hungarian Communist Party politicians
Members of the Hungarian Working People's Party
Members of the Hungarian Socialist Workers' Party
Prime Ministers of Hungary
Members of the National Assembly of Hungary (1945–1947)
Members of the National Assembly of Hungary (1947–1949)
Members of the National Assembly of Hungary (1949–1953)
Members of the National Assembly of Hungary (1953–1958)
Hungarian Comintern people
Stalinism
Anti-revisionists
20th-century atheists
Hungarian atheism activists
Jewish atheists
Jewish socialists
Hungarian People's Republic
Jewish prime ministers
Hungarian prisoners of war
Austro-Hungarian prisoners of war in World War I
World War I prisoners of war held by Russia
Hungarian people of the Hungarian–Romanian War
Hungarian expatriates in the Soviet Union
People of the Hungarian Revolution of 1956
Burials at Farkasréti Cemetery